A Treaty of Perpetual Peace was signed in 1534 between James V of Scotland and Henry VIII of England.

References

1534 treaties
Peace treaties of England
Peace treaties of Scotland